Little Britain may refer to:

Arts and entertainment
 Little Britain (sketch show), a British radio and then TV show
 Little Britain USA, an American spin-off
 "Little Britain", a song by Dreadzone from the 1995 album Second Light
 Little Britain: The Video Game

Places
 'Little Britain', a translation of several historic terms referring to Ireland
 'Little Britain', a translation of the Irish toponym , referring to Wales.
 'Little Britain', a historic designation for Brittany
 Little Britain, London, England, a street and historically a small district
 Little Britain, Buckinghamshire, England, in Greater London on the Bucks boundary
 Little Britain, Ontario, Canada
 Little Britain, one of the Urban neighbourhoods of Sudbury, Ontario, Canada
 Little Britain, Mariposa Township, Ontario, Canada
 Little Britain, New York, U.S.
 Little Britain, Pennsylvania, U.S.
 Little Britain Township, Lancaster County, Pennsylvania, U.S.

See also

 Britain (disambiguation)
 Little England (disambiguation)
 New Britain (disambiguation)
 Great Britain